Paweł Charbicki (born 6 November 1965) is a retired Polish football goalkeeper.

References

1965 births
Living people
Polish footballers
Sokół Ostróda players
OKS Stomil Olsztyn players
Świt Nowy Dwór Mazowiecki players
Ekstraklasa players
I liga players
Association football goalkeepers